The Jefferson Literary and Debating Society (commonly known "Jeff Soc") is the oldest continuously existing collegiate debating society in North America, having been founded on July 14, 1825, in Room Seven, West Lawn. Named after founder of the University, Thomas Jefferson, the society regularly meets on Friday evenings at Hotel C in the Academical Village, referred to as "Jefferson Hall", "Jeff Hall", or simply "The Hall".

Members have included several Presidents of the United States, a British Prime Minister, Margaret Thatcher, alongside governors, senators and congresspeople. The society also counts itself as the second oldest Greek-lettered organization in the United States, after Phi Beta Kappa. Its Latin motto, is taken from Virgil's Aeneid and roughly translates to, "In the future it will be pleasing to remember these things." Room Seven, West Lawn, is also maintained by the Jefferson Society, selecting a Fourth Year student to live there. The Society hosts several events throughout the year including its Distinguished Speaker Series, for which it invites prominent scholars and speakers across disciplines to address students. The Society also hosts formal social events including Wilson's Day, the Restoration Ball, and Founder's Day, first held in 1832.

History 
Membership in the society grew rapidly in the early years after its founding. By 1855, the University of Virginia was the second largest university in the nation after Harvard University, enrolling 645 students. That school year, the society admitted 155 new members: nearly a quarter of the student body of the university.

In the hotheaded antebellum years, the society could become raucous. Its elections were condemned by the faculty for "such turbulence as to degrade the reputation of the University." An especially coveted honor was to be selected as "final orator," a post apparently comparable to that of a valedictorian today.

The society played a key role in establishing student journalism at the University, founding the University Magazine as early as 1856. Later known as the Virginia Spectator, the paper played a major part in University life for a century, with its profile ranging from high seriousness to satire, until being shut down by the president of the university in the late 1950s for obscenity. The Jefferson Society sponsored the magazine for many decades.

Also in 1856, the society expressed its approval of the caning of Charles Sumner by sending Preston Brooks a new gold-headed cane to replace his broken one.

Possessions
 The Sully Portrait is one of the only portraits of Thomas Jefferson painted from life. It was painted by Thomas Sully and is loaned to the University of Virginia to be displayed in the Rotunda. 
 Edgar Allan Poe signed a minutes book one evening during which he served as secretary pro tem. His signature was later clipped out by Lancelot Blackford in the 1850s, stealing it, yet also saving it from the Great Rotunda Fire in 1895. Society alumni raised money to buy the signature from a collector in the early 1980s, in honor of their friend and fellow alumnus, James F. Perz. The signature is kept in secure storage as part of the University library's special collections.
 Thomas Woodrow Wilson signed one of the roll books during his tenure as the Society's President. Furthermore, the Society's minute books also contain many sets of handwritten minutes signed by Wilson when he was the Society's Secretary.

Notable members
 Edgar Allan Poe, author of "The Raven"
 Woodrow Wilson, 28th President of the United States
 Edward Stettinius Jr., Secretary of State and Ambassador to the United Nations
 Hugh Scott, United States Representative and Senator from Pennsylvania
 Colgate W. Darden, Governor of Virginia
 John T. Casteen III, University of Virginia President
 James Gilmore III, Governor of Virginia
 Deidre Downs, Miss America 2005
 Jamelle Bouie, political correspondent and journalist
 Barbara M.G. Lynn, Chief United States District Judge

Honorary members
 James Madison, 4th President of the United States
 James Monroe, 5th President of the United States
 Gilbert du Motier, Marquis de Lafayette
 Edith Bolling Galt Wilson, former First Lady of the United States
 William Faulkner, Nobel Prize for Literature recipient
 Margaret Thatcher, former Prime Minister of the United Kingdom

Thomas Jefferson turned down an invitation for honorary membership in an August 12, 1825 letter, citing his need to avoid altering his relationship with the University and its students.

Related
 The Dialectic and Philanthropic Societies at University of North Carolina at Chapel Hill
 The Philodemic Society at Georgetown University
 The Philolexian Society at Columbia University
 The Philomathean Society at the University of Pennsylvania
 The Union-Philanthropic Society at Hampden–Sydney College
 The Eumenean Society and Philanthropic Society at Davidson College
 The Euphradian Society and Clariosophic Society at the University of South Carolina
 The Washington Literary Society and Debating Union at the University of Virginia
 The Stubbs Society at the University of Oxford
The Demosthenian Literary Society at the University of Georgia

Notes and references

 Carrier, Jerry and Michael Stewart. Hotel C, West Range, University of Virginia. University of Virginia Press.

External links
 Official Web Site: Jefferson Literary and Debating Society

University of Virginia
Student debating societies
1825 establishments in Virginia